Þórarinn Brynjar Kristjánsson (born 30 December 1980) is an Icelandic professional football player. He played three times for Aberdeen in the 2004–05 Scottish Premier League season.

References

1980 births
Living people
Thorarinn Kristjansson
Thorarinn Kristjansson
Thorarinn Kristjansson
Expatriate footballers in Scotland
East Stirlingshire F.C. players
Scottish Premier League players
Aberdeen F.C. players
Thorarinn Kristjansson
Association football forwards